Blood Brother is an American action-thriller film directed by John Pogue and written by Michael Finch, Karl Gajdusek, and Charles Murray. The film stars Trey Songz.

Premise
A recently released convict begins to take murderous revenge against his childhood friends, whom he believes let him take the fall for a crime they collectively committed. As the bodies start piling up, one of the friends Sonny (Trey Songz), now a police officer, will stop at nothing to put an end to the murderous rampage and to right the many wrongs of their tragically violent past.

Cast
Trey Songz as Sonny
Jack Kesy as Jake Banning
R-Truth as Blaine
Fetty Wap as Emilio
Hassan Johnson as Joe
China Anne McClain as Darcy
J. D. Williams as Kayvon

Production
Blood Brother was originally titled Brother's Blood, and was announced in December 2015. Principal photography on the film began on January 13, 2016 in New Orleans. WWE Studios would be co-producing and co-financing the film under a deal with Lionsgate's CodeBlack Entertainment, with Michael Luisi producing for WWE.

Reception
Blood Brother received mostly negative reviews from critics. Critics of the review aggregator site Rotten Tomatoes gave the film , based on  reviews, receiving  average rating. On Metacritic, Blood Brothers score is higher by 1%, holding it on 18%, based on 4 reviews, indicating "overwhelming dislike".

See also
List of hood films

References

External links

2018 action thriller films
2010s English-language films
American films about revenge
American action thriller films
Films directed by John Pogue
Films shot in New Orleans
Hood films
Lionsgate films
WWE Studios films
2010s American films